Poésies is an 1887 poetry collection by the French writer Stéphane Mallarmé.

Publication
Poésies was first published in 1887 by La Revue indépendante. It was republished by Edmond Deman in 1899, the year after Mallarmé's death; this edition included an additional section where Mallarmé wrote about the background and circumstances under which most of the poems had been written. The book was translated to English by Arthur Symons, and first published in its entirety in 1986 by Tragara Press.

See also
 1887 in poetry
 19th-century French literature
 Symbolism (arts)

References

1887 books
French poetry collections
Poetry by Stéphane Mallarmé